NGC 7510 is an open cluster of stars located around 11,400 light years away in the constellation Cepheus, near the border with Cassiopeia. At this distance, the light from the cluster has undergone extinction from interstellar gas and dust equal to  =  magnitude in the UBV photometric system. Its brightest member is a giant star with a stellar classification of B1.5 III. This cluster forms part of the Perseus Spiral Arm.

References

External links

 

Cepheus (constellation)
7510
Open clusters